Roosmarijn "Roos" de Kok (born ) is a Dutch fashion model, best known for her work for Victoria's Secret.

Early life 

De Kok was born on 18 December 1994 in Amerongen, Netherlands.

Career 
She was discovered at a birthday party where another guest, who was a model, told her to look into modelling and sent a picture of her to Wilhelmina Models. After video-calling the agency, she was asked to come to New York City and signed with the agency in early 2013. She was formerly signed to Wilhelmina Models.

She has been in campaigns for brands such as Balmain, H&M, Pacsun, Victoria’s Secret, Tom Ford, Wildfox Couture, and Giuseppe Zanotti. She has appeared in editorials for various international editions of Vogue and Elle.

De Kok has walked the runway for brands such as Philipp Plein, Oscar de la Renta, Cushnie, Balmain, Ralph Lauren, and the Victoria's Secret Fashion Show. 
  
De Kok was described as the "model du moment" by the Daily Front Row in 2016. Vogue Australia described her as one of the new era supermodels.

In 2018, De Kok launched Roos Unlimited, a company for investments and brand collaboration.

Personal life 
De Kok lived in New York City. She has since moved to Miami, Florida.

Legal incident 
In 2014, De Kok was arrested for allegedly stealing from a New York City Whole Foods store. She appeared in Manhattan Criminal Court where her case was eventually dismissed and she was ordered to do one day of community service.

References 

1994 births
Living people
Dutch female models
People from Amerongen
Dutch expatriates in the United States
Women Management models